38th New York Film Critics Circle Awards
January 3, 1973

Best Picture: 
 Cries and Whispers 
The 38th New York Film Critics Circle Awards, announced on 3 January 1973, honored the best filmmaking of 1972.

Winners
Best Actor: 
Laurence Olivier - Sleuth
Runners-up: Marlon Brando - The Godfather and James Mason - Child's Play
Best Actress: 
Liv Ullmann - Cries and Whispers (Viskningar och rop) and The Emigrants (Utvandrarna)
Runners-up: Cicely Tyson - Sounder, Harriet Andersson - Cries and Whispers (Viskningar och rop) and Janet Suzman - A Day in the Death of Joe Egg
Best Director: 
Ingmar Bergman - Cries and Whispers (Viskningar och rop)
Runners-up: Francis Ford Coppola - The Godfather and Luis Buñuel - The Discreet Charm of the Bourgeoisie (Le charme discret de la bourgeoisie)
Best Film: 
Cries and Whispers (Viskningar och rop)
Runners-up: The Godfather and The Emigrants (Utvandrarna)
Best Screenplay:
Ingmar Bergman - Cries and Whispers (Viskningar och rop)
Runners-up: Luis Buñuel and Jean-Claude Carrière - The Discreet Charm of the Bourgeoisie (Le charme discret de la bourgeoisie)
Best Supporting Actor: 
Robert Duvall - The Godfather
Runners-up: Eddie Albert - The Heartbreak Kid and Robert Shaw - Young Winston
Best Supporting Actress: 
Jeannie Berlin - The Heartbreak Kid
Runners-up: Susan Tyrrell - Fat City and Ida Lupino - Junior Bonner
Special Award: 
The Sorrow and the Pity

References

External links
1972 Awards

1972
New York Film Critics Circle Awards, 1972
New York Film Critics Circle Awards
New York Film Critics Circle Awards
New York Film Critics Circle Awards
New York Film Critics Circle Awards